The HHLA Container Terminal Altenwerder (CTA) in Hamburg, Germany currently is one of the most modern container terminals in the world, located in the Altenwerder quarter. It is owned by the Hamburger Hafen und Logistik AG (HHLA) (74.9%) and Hapag-LLoyd AG shipping lines (25.1%) and lies to the south of Hamburg on the river Elbe.

TEU annually. Right now, 2.4 Millions TEU capacity is used.

With 12 millions M3 sand heaped up, a height difference between dock edge and base of the Elbe river of  created.

The centric container area with a capacity of 30.000 TEU takes the largest part of the surface with connections for cooltainers. The area is served by 22 pairs of cranes and 53 vehicles. The characteristic of the terminal is the nearly fully automated operational sequence.

The way of a container in the CTA
The ship sets on one of the four couch places. One of the 14 two-Katz container bridges takes care of the container. First the crane driver in the main cat transports it on the lax platform of the bridge, where lax worker removes Twistlocks. In the port, the fully automatic handling begins. As soon as one of the 65 AGVs on the land side of the bridge automated themselves, the portal cat reloads the container. The driverless AGV finds its way to the destination conveyed by radio waves and moreover it is being watched by GPS. The pedestrian access to the area of AGV drive is prohibited for security reasons.

The AGV parks in front of one of the 26 camp blocks, where a pair of gantry cranes (double Rail Mounted Gantry - DRMG) unloads the container for temporary storage. Each block covers 10 rows of 37 TEU places, at each place can four - in the external rows five - containers be stacked. The DRMG consists of two independent cranes, so that the sea-side with the AGV and the opposite side with the trucks can be served simultaneously. Due to their different sizes, two cranes can work simultaneously over the entire block, the smaller crane drives simply under the larger one.

The container is loaded from the DRMG on the chassis of the truck. This procedure is remote controlled.

If the container is to be carried on by truck, it remains on the chassis. In the case of a rail transport, it is led to the station. It is loaded there by one of the three manual rail cranes on the train. The drivers of the trucks receive their driving orders from radio data transmission terminals within the CTA.

Before leaving the port, the railway or the road, another tariff control takes place.

External links 

 Hamburger Hafen- und Logistik-AG
 Hafen Hamburg

Buildings and structures in Harburg, Hamburg
Economy of Hamburg
Container terminals